Old Neighborhoods Historic District is a national historic district located at Lexington, Lafayette County, Missouri.   The district encompasses 267 contributing buildings in a predominantly residential section of Lexington. It developed between about 1830 and 1930, and includes representative examples of Late Victorian and Greek Revival style architecture.  Located in the district are the separately listed Cumberland Presbyterian Church and Waddell House.  Other notable contributing resources include the McGrew House (c. 1890), Schacklett House (c. 1888), Waddell-Pomercy House (c. 1836), Waddell-Young House (c. 1840), First Christian Church (c. 1870), Walter B. Waddell House (c. 1905), Eggleston House (c. 1880), Lafayette Arms (c. 1840), United Methodist Church (c. 1865), Reorganized Church of Jesus Christ of Latter Day Saints (c. 1925), Marquis W. Withers House (c. 1870), John Eggleston House (c. 1840), Christ Church Episcopal (c. 1848), Trinity United Church of Christ (c. 1923), Old German Catholic Church (c. 1882), and Lexington Middle School (c. 1926).

It was listed on the National Register of Historic Places in 1983.

References

Historic districts on the National Register of Historic Places in Missouri
Greek Revival architecture in Missouri
Victorian architecture in Missouri
Buildings and structures in Lafayette County, Missouri
National Register of Historic Places in Lafayette County, Missouri